Valdas Adamkus (born Voldemaras Adamkavičius; 3 November 1926) is a Lithuanian-American politician, diplomat and civil engineer. He served as the 5th and 7th President of Lithuania from 1998 to 2003 and again from 2004 to 2009.

Adamkus' first tenure as president lasted for five years, from 26 February 1998 to 28 February 2003, following his defeat by Rolandas Paksas in the 2003 presidential election. Paksas was later impeached and removed from office by a parliamentary vote on 6 April 2004. Soon afterwards, when a new election was announced, Adamkus again ran for president and was re-elected. His approval ratings increased during this period and become a highly regarded moral authority in the state. He was succeeded as president on 12 July 2009 by Dalia Grybauskaitė. He is considered by some as being one of the best Lithuanian leaders in modern history.

He is married to Alma Adamkienė, who is involved in charitable activities in Lithuania. Following the end of his term as president, Adamkus remained involved in international development, and is a member of the European Academy of Diplomacy.

Biography 
Valdas Adamkus was born on 3 November 1926, into a Roman Catholic family in Kaunas. He was originally given the name "Voldemaras Adamkavičius" but had it changed to "Valdas Adamkus" in 1955. His father was one of the first heads of the Lithuanian Air Force School in the Republic of Lithuania. His uncle was Edvardas Adamkavičius, who was the general in Lithuanian Armed Forces during the interwar period. During his youth, Adamkus was interested in track and field. He also set the national record for running 100 meters.

As a young man, Adamkus joined the underground resistance against the first Soviet occupation of Lithuania in 1940. Under the Nazi occupation, while attending high school, he distributed an anti-German underground newspaper. In 1944 as the Germans were leaving the country, his family fled Lithuania in order to avoid the second Soviet occupation.

He attended the University of Munich in Germany before emigrating to the United States in 1949. Fluent in five languages – Lithuanian, Polish, English, Russian, and German – he served as a senior non-commissioned officer with the United States 5th Army Reserve's military intelligence unit in the 1950s. In 1951, Adamkus married Alma Nutautaite. They have no children.

After arriving in Chicago, Illinois as a displaced person, he first worked in an automobile factory and later as a draftsman. Adamkus graduated as a civil engineer from Illinois Institute of Technology in 1961. While a student, Adamkus, together with other Lithuanian Americans, collected about 40,000 signatures petitioning the United States government to intervene in the ongoing deportations of Lithuanians to Siberia by the Soviets. The petition was presented to then-Vice President Richard Nixon. Adamkus also raised concerns about other Soviet activities in occupied Lithuania to United Nations Secretary General Dag Hammarskjöld in 1958, and to President John F. Kennedy in 1962.

Career in the United States Environmental Protection Agency 
He joined the United States Environmental Protection Agency (EPA) at its inception in 1970, working in Cincinnati. In 1981, he was appointed regional administrator by President Ronald Reagan, and was responsible for all air, water, hazardous waste, and other pollution control programs in Illinois, Indiana, Michigan, Minnesota, Ohio, and Wisconsin. In 1985, President Reagan presented him with the Distinguished Executive Presidential Rank Awardthe highest honor that can be bestowed upon a civil servant.

In 1972, Adamkus visited Lithuania for the first time in almost thirty years. He was a member of the official delegation from the United States attending an environmental conference in Moscow. As perestroika took root in the Soviet Union, Adamkus's visits to his homeland became more frequent. Valdas Adamkus served as regional administrator of the EPA for sixteen years, and retired in 1997, after twenty-nine years of service. Upon his retirement, he received a congratulatory letter from President Clinton and a Distinguished Career Award from EPA Administrator Carol Browner. EPA Region 5 presented him with the newly established "Valdas V. Adamkus Sustained Commitment to the Environment Honor Award".

Lithuanian presidency, 1998–2003 
Shortly after leaving the EPA, Valdas Adamkus moved back to Lithuania. Soon after his decision to run for presidency in 1998, he faced a legal battle in the Lithuanian courts. Doubts arose whether Adamkus was eligible to run for the presidency due to having spent over half a century abroad, raising the possibility that he might not meet minimum residency requirements. However, the court resolved the case in Adamkus' favor, and no other obstacles remained other than his U.S. citizenship, which he officially renounced at the American Embassy in Vilnius. He was elected as President of Lithuania in 1998, defeating Artūras Paulauskas in the runoff, serving from then until 2003, when he ran for re-election, but was unexpectedly defeated by Rolandas Paksas.

He returned to politics after the presidential scandal of 2003 and 2004, when his former rival Paksas was impeached and removed from office. In the first round of the 2004 election, held on 13 June 2004, Adamkus securing 30% of the vote – more than any other candidate. Paksas could not run for office again, because a ruling from Lithuania's Constitutional Court disallowed him from running for public office and he was, therefore, unable to register as a candidate. A runoff election was held on 27 June 2004, which Adamkus won with about 52% of the votes against Kazimira Prunskienė. By 2009 he had served the two presidential terms permitted by the Constitution of Lithuania and was succeeded as president by Dalia Grybauskaite.

In 2003 Valdas Adamkus was named UNESCO Goodwill Ambassador for the Construction of Knowledge Societies. The Director-General of UNESCO, Koïchiro Matsuura, noted that Adamkus was named as Ambassador "in recognition of his dedication to the Organization's aims and ideals and with a view to benefiting for the construction of knowledge societies from his wisdom and extensive experience in many of UNESCO's areas of concern, in particular promotion of social development, cultural diversity, dialog and international cooperation."

Lithuanian presidency, 2004–2009

Foreign affairs
Under the presidency of Valdas Adamkus, Lithuania actively promoted democracy in the formerly Soviet Eastern European and Asian nations. President Adamkus, together with President Aleksander Kwaśniewski, Javier Solana, Boris Gryzlov and Ján Kubiš, served as a mediator during Ukraine's political crisis, when two candidates in the 2004 presidential election, Viktor Yanukovych and Viktor Yushchenko, each claimed victory. President Adamkus recalled in an interview that "when I asked what we could do to help, Kuchma said the friends of the Ukrainian people should drop whatever they were doing and come to Kiev immediately.". The next day international mediators met in Ukraine. The crisis was resolved after a new election was held.

Valdas Adamkus and his Estonian counterpart Arnold Rüütel rejected an invitation to participate in a commemorative celebration of the end of World War II in Europe in 2005. President Adamkus expressed the view that the war's end, in Lithuania, marked the beginning of a fifty-year Soviet occupation and repression. In response, on 22 July, the United States Congress unanimously passed a resolution that Russia should "issue a clear and unambiguous statement of admission and condemnation of the illegal occupation and annexation by the Soviet Union from 1940 to 1991 of the Baltic countries of Estonia, Latvia, and Lithuania", but Russia refused.

President Adamkus supports an active dialog between European Union member states and former Soviet republics such as Georgia, Ukraine, and Moldova, that are actively seeking membership in the EU. He expressed support for these candidate members during the Community of Democratic Choice in 2005, at the Vilnius Conference 2006, and on several other occasions.

Valdas Adamkus is an Honorary Member of The International Raoul Wallenberg Foundation.

Domestic affairs
Valdas Adamkus enjoyed a very high approval rating in Lithuania. He was also recognized for the second time for his support of Lithuanian youth. President Adamkus was actively involved in government reorganizations in 2004 and 2006. In his 2006 State of the Nation address, Adamkus stated that his top priorities were:
 Increasing public participation in the political realm
 Targeted and transparent use of the EU funds and opportunities for building a greater well-being in Lithuania
 Reforms in public governance, education and science, social support and health care
 The development of professional competence among civil servants, especially in assessing regulatory impacts
 Approval of a political code of ethics
 Direct mayoral elections, and elimination of the county system
 Construction of a new nuclear power unit in Ignalina
 Legislation regulating the selection, appointment, and promotion of judges
 Controlling "brain drain" by supporting research and higher education infrastructure

Honors and awards

National honours

 : Recipient of the Order of Vytautas the Great with Golden Chain (2003)
 : Recipient of the Lithuanian Scout Association Order of Iron Wolf (2002)
 : Recipient of the Medal for Merits to Vilnius and the Nation (2019)
 : Recipient of the Golden Order of the State Emblem of Lithuania (2019)
 : Recipient of the Riflemen's Star

Foreign honors
 : President's Award for Distinguished Federal Civilian Service (1985)
 : Grand Cross of the Order of the Falcon (1998)
 : Grand Cross of the Order of St. Olav (1998)
 : Member First Class of the Order of Prince Yaroslav the Wise (1998)
 : Collar of the Order of the Cross of Terra Mariana (1999)
 : Golden Plate Award of the American Academy of Achievement (1999)
 : Grand Cross of the Order of the Redeemer (1999)
 : Knight Grand Cross with Collar of the Order of Merit of the Italian Republic (1999)
 : Knight of the Order of the White Eagle (1999)
 : Grand Cross of the National Order of Merit (1999)
 : Knight Grand Cross of the Order of Merit of the Republic of Hungary {1999)
 : Recipient 1st class of the Order of Friendship (2000}
 : Commander Grand Cross with Chain of the Order of Three Stars (2001)
 : Grand Cross of the Order of the Legion of Honour {2001)
 : Collar of the Order of the Star of Romania (2001)
 : St Andrew 'Dialog of Civilization' prize laureate (2002)
 : Recipient of the Order of St. Meshrop Mashtots (2002)
 : Collar and the Grand Cross of the Order of the White Rose (2002)
 : Member of the Order For Special Merits (2002)
 : Collar of the Order of the White Star (2004)
 : Knight of the Collar of the Order of Isabel the Catholic (2005)
 : Grand Cross Special Class of the Order of Merit of the Federal Republic of Germany (2005)
 : Recipient of the Order of the White Double Cross (2005)
 : Grand Cordon of the Order of Leopold (2006)
 : Knight Grand Cross of the Order of the Bath (2006)
 : Member First Class of the Order of Merit (2006)
 : European of the Year (2007)
 : Member of the Order of Mother Theresa (2007)
 : Grand Cordon of the Supreme Order of the Chrysanthemum (2007)
 : Grand Collar of the Order of Prince Henry (2007)
 : Recipient of the St. George's Victory Order (2007)
 : Knight Grand Cross of the Order of the Netherlands Lion (2008)
 : Collar of the Order of the Merit of Chile (2008)
 : Grand Star of the Decoration for Services to the Republic of Austria (2009)
 : Member of the Order of Stara Planina (2009)
 : Recipient of the Order of Polonia Restituta (2009)
 : Recipient of the Order of Liberty (2009)

Honorary doctorates 
Adamkus holds honorary doctorates at universities in Lithuania, the United States and other countries, including:
 : Vilnius University (1989)
 : Indiana St. Joseph's College (1991)
 : Northwestern University (1994)
 : Kaunas University of Technology (1998)
 : The Catholic University of America (1998)
 : Lithuanian University of Agriculture (1999)
 : Illinois Institute of Technology (1999)
 : Eurasian University (2000)
 : DePaul University (2001)
 : Law University of Lithuania (2001)
 : Vytautas Magnus University (2002)
 : Lithuanian Academy of Physical Education (2004)
 : Yerevan State University (2006)
 : Baku State University (2006)
 : Donetsk University (2006)
 : University of Notre Dame (2007)
 : Nicolaus Copernicus University (2007)
 : Tallinn University (2008)
 : University of Chile (2008)
 : Klaipėda University (2008)
 : John Paul II Catholic University (2009)
 : ISM University of Management and Economics (2009)

See also 
List of presidents of Lithuania
Presidential Palace, Vilnius
Historical Presidential Palace, Kaunas
Knight of Freedom Award

References

Further reading 
 Fredriksen, John C. ed. Biographical Dictionary of Modern World Leaders: 1992 to the Present'' (Facts on File Library of World History) (2003) pp 5–6

External links 

 Website of the Lithuanian President Valdas Adamkus 
 European Voice – Mister persistent Valdas Adamkus

|-

1926 births
Lithuanian emigrants to the United States
Lithuanian-American culture in Chicago
Politicians from Chicago
Illinois Institute of Technology alumni
Politicians from Kaunas
Ludwig Maximilian University of Munich alumni
Living people
Presidents of Lithuania
Lithuanian Roman Catholics
American people of Lithuanian descent
Lithuanian male sprinters
People of the United States Environmental Protection Agency
People who renounced United States citizenship
United States Army non-commissioned officers

Knights Grand Cross of the Order of the Falcon
Recipients of the Order of Prince Yaroslav the Wise, 1st class
Grand Croix of the Légion d'honneur
Grand Crosses with Golden Chain of the Order of Vytautas the Great
Collars of the Order of Isabella the Catholic
Honorary Knights Grand Cross of the Order of the Bath
Recipients of the Grand Star of the Decoration for Services to the Republic of Austria
Recipients of the Collar of the Order of the Cross of Terra Mariana
Knights Grand Cross with Collar of the Order of Merit of the Italian Republic
Chevaliers of the Order of Merit (Ukraine)
Catholics from Ohio
Recipients of St. George's Order of Victory
Grand Crosses Special Class of the Order of Merit of the Federal Republic of Germany
UNESCO Goodwill Ambassadors
Catholics from Illinois
Recipients of the President's Award for Distinguished Federal Civilian Service
First Class of the Order of the Star of Romania
Recipients of the Order of the White Eagle (Poland)
Recipients of the Order of Prince Yaroslav the Wise, 2nd class